Tanush Thopia or Tanusio Thopia (d. 1467) was an Albanian nobleman and one of the closest collaborators of Gjergj Kastrioti Skanderbeg.

Thopia descended from the Thopia family that converted from Orthodox Christianity to Catholicism. In 1444, together with his uncle Andrea Thopia, he participated in the founding of the League of Lezhë, the military alliance led by Skanderbeg. He was a commander of the infantry of the League of Lezhë, and his garrison became famous for their resistance during the Second Siege of Krujë. After that siege he is no longer mentioned in historical sources, and some suppose that he might have been killed in the end of that battle or died soon afterwards. He was a skillful commander and his loyalty to Skanderbeg was undeterred and that was the reason why he was appointed in that delicate position.

The name Tanush is an Albanian exonym for Athanassius.

References

15th-century Albanian people
1460s deaths
Tanush
Year of birth unknown
Skanderbeg
Albanian Roman Catholics